Shobha Raju is a popular Indian musician, devotional singer, writer and composer, known as an exponent of sankirtana of the gospel of the 15th-century saint-composer, Annamacharya. She was awarded the Padma Shri by Government of India for her contributions to arts in 2010. She is the founder of "Annamacharya Bhavana Vahini" (ABV).

Career
While composing her own songs at the age of four, to cutting her first gramophone record and becoming an All India Radio Artiste at the age of 16, to being awarded the prize at national level competitions at the age of 17, she has been constantly trained under various music masters such as Sri Nedunuri Krishna Murthy and Mrs. Rajyalakshmi in music, Mr. R. G. Narayana Raju for spirituality, among others. Dr. Shobha is the first recipient of TTD's scholarship in 1976 to study and set a trend for the propagation of Annamacharya's compositions, and was also chosen as the first exclusive artiste for the propagation of Annamacharya"s compositions in 1978. Her first audio album, "Venkateswara Geeta Malika" is globally popular among Telugu community.

Apart from serving as Project Officer for "Rama Rasa Vahini", a music-based project in Endowments Dept, sponsored by Bhadrachalam Devasthanam; authoring books such as "Srihari Padartham", "Pedda Tirumalayya Parichayam"; her various projects in the field of music and culture include: National Level Music Competitions to encourage youth, organisation of the anniversaries of Annamacharya; discovering and publishing 39 compositions of Annamayya as the "Annamayya Gupta Sankeertanadhanam"; "Shanti Sankeertanam" to enlighten people against the acts of terrorism; "Nagara Sankeertana", singing in processions for spiritual awareness; stage concerts and presentation of "Sankeertanaushadham" (Therapeutic Music Programs) for the benefit of patients in the hospitals both at India and abroad; self-scripted musical feature, "Annamayya Katha"; presentation of "Upashamana Sankeertana", a special program for the relief of the prisoners; writing the story, script, screenplay, dialogues, music, and directing a tele-serial, "Sri Annamacharya"; application of "Swarayoga", a special program for the personality development; annual "Vaggeyakarotsavams" of 1983 celebrated in national level; and others. She played an important role in getting the Postal Dept of Govt. of India to release the postage stamp of Annamacharya in Annamayyapuram.

Biography
Sobha Raju was born in Vayalpadu, Annamayya District, A.P. Her father R. G. Narayana Raju, a retired Deputy Collector was a native of Tirumala Reddypalle, Chitoor Dist. and her first spiritual mentor, while her mother Smt. Rajyalakshmi, was her first music teacher in Music.

She did her B.A. with History, Economics & Music from Sri. Padmavathi Women's College, Tirupati, A. P.

She is married to Dr. S. Nanda Kumar, who resigned the post of Project Executive in National Dairy Development Board to support her mission.

She received her training in music from teachers like, Mr. Pullaiah, Mr. D. Seshagiri Rao, Mr. Pakala Munirathnam, Mr Tiruttani Krishnamurthy, Prof. Kalpakam, Sri Nedunuri Krishna Murthy garu.

Spiritual Masters: She is greatly inspired by the teachings of Sri Ramakrishana Paramahamsa and Swami Vivekananda. Swami Paramahamsa Yoganandaji's teaching have a tremendous influence on her. The holy company of Swamy Chinmayyanandaji, Swami Dayanandaji, Sri Swamy Vidya Prakasanandaji, and Bhagawan Sri Satya Sai Baba helped a great deal in moulding her personality. She used to sing Bhajans and recite Bhagawad Geeta during their discourses

Other work
Dr. Shobha Raju is also a writer. She has written many stories and articles published by the popular magazines and papers including Andhra Prabha, Swathi, Andhra Bhoomi etc. She is also the author of a few booklets like "Sripadartham" (Commentaries to Annamayya Compositions), "Pedatirumalayya Parichayam"  etc.

She has been composing many songs and poetry pieces right from her childhood. Her compositions are bought out into audio albums by different audio companies and temples.

Music Composer: Dr. Shobha Raju has been a well acclaimed music composer. Different audio companies have brought out her albums for which she herself set the music. She is also the music director for the Tele serial "Sri Annamacharya".

She is the Director of many video programs, including the Tele serial "Sri Annamacharya". She is an organiser of many events and festivals.

Awards and recognition

Dr. Shobha Raju is a recipient of the civilian award "Padma Shri" from the Government of India in 2010. Government of Andhra Pradesh honored her with Hamsa Award in 2013. Dr.Shobha Raju also received many other awards in the field of art, culture and music. These include: "Annamayya Pada Kokila" by Telugu Association of North America; "Sankeertana Praveena" by Telugu Kala Samithi, Kuwait in 2000; Paidi Lakshmiah Merit Award; "Ugadi Puraskar" by Madras Telugu Academy; "Smt Ravoori Kanthamma Bharadwaja Award"; "ANR Swarna Kankanam"; "Abhinava Annamayya" by Telugu Association of North Texas; "Out Standing Woman Award" by NTR Trust; "Out Standing Woman Award" by Mahila Congress on the eve of Indira Gandhi's birthday; among many more.  Apart from her graduation from Sri Padmavathi Women's College of Tirupati, she  has also been awarded an Honorary Doctorate from P.S. Telugu University; has been honoured as "Asthana Vidushi" by the Dwaraka Tirumala Devasthanam, India; The India Cultural center & Temple, Memphis, Tennessee, United States, nominated as a member on the South Zone Cultural Centre & South Central Zone Cultural Center in 1985; a member on the advisory panel of regional ICCR; and serving many years as Advisor, Annamacharya Project, TTD.

References

External links
 annamayya.org

Indian women playback singers
1957 births
Living people
Recipients of the Padma Shri in arts
People from Chittoor district
Women Carnatic singers
Carnatic singers
Indian music educators
Performers of Hindu music
Singers from Andhra Pradesh
20th-century Indian singers
Indian women composers
20th-century Indian composers
20th-century Indian women singers
21st-century Indian composers
21st-century Indian women singers
21st-century Indian singers
20th-century Indian women musicians
21st-century Indian women musicians
Women musicians from Andhra Pradesh
Women music educators
20th-century women composers
21st-century women composers